Events from the year 1937 in the United States.

Incumbents

Federal Government 
 President: Franklin D. Roosevelt (D-New York)
 Vice President: John Nance Garner (D-Texas)
 Chief Justice: Charles Evans Hughes (New York)
 Speaker of the House of Representatives: William B. Bankhead (D-Alabama)
 Senate Majority Leader: Joseph Taylor Robinson (D-Arkansas) (until July 14), Alben W. Barkley (D-Kentucky) (starting July 22)
 Congress: 74th (until January 3), 75th (starting January 3)

Events

January–March
 January 11 – The first issue of Look magazine goes on sale.
 January 12 – Adventurer and filmmaker Martin Johnson, of Martin and Osa Johnson fame, is killed along with four others in the crash of Western Air Express Flight 7 in mountainous terrain near Saugus, California.
 January 19 – Howard Hughes sets a new record by flying from Los Angeles to New York City in 7 hours, 28 minutes and 25 seconds.
 January 20 – Chief Justice Charles Evans Hughes swears in Franklin D. Roosevelt for a second term. This is the first time Inauguration Day in the United States occurs on this date, in response to the ratification in 1933 of the 20th amendment to the U.S. Constitution. Inauguration has occurred on January 20 ever since. John Nance Garner is sworn in for a second term as Vice President of the United States.
 January 26 – Michigan celebrates its Centennial Anniversary of statehood.
 January 31 – The Ohio River floods.
 February 5 – President Franklin D. Roosevelt proposes a plan to enlarge the Supreme Court of the United States.
 February 6 – John Steinbeck's novella of the Great Depression Of Mice and Men is published.
 February 11 – A sit-down strike ends when General Motors recognizes the United Automobile Workers Union.
 February 16 – Wallace H. Carothers receives a patent for nylon.
 March 2 – The Steel Workers Organizing Committee, precursor to United Steelworkers, signs a collective bargaining agreement with U.S. Steel.
 March 4 – The 9th Academy Awards, hosted by George Jessel, are presented at Biltmore Hotel in Los Angeles, with Robert Z. Leonard's The Great Ziegfeld winning the Outstanding Production. The film was among two others (being Mervyn LeRoy's Anthony Adverse and William Wyler's Dodsworth) to each receive the most nominations with seven, while Anthony Adverse won the most awards with four. Frank Capra receives his second Best Director award for Mr. Deeds Goes to Town.
 March 26 – William Henry Hastie becomes the first African-American appointed to a federal judgeship.
 March – The first issue of the comic book Detective Comics is published in the United States. Twenty-seven issues later, Detective Comics introduces Batman. The comic goes on to become the longest continually published comic magazine in American history; it is still published as of 2017.
 March 17 – The Atherton Report (private investigator Edwin Atherton's report detailing vice and police corruption in San Francisco) is released.
 March 18 
In the worst school disaster in American history in terms of lives lost, the New London School in New London, Texas suffers a catastrophic natural gas explosion, killing in excess of 295 students and teachers.
Mother Frances Hospital opens in Tyler, Texas in response to the New London School explosion.
 March 26 – In Crystal City, Texas, spinach growers erect a statue of the cartoon character Popeye.
 March 28 – Sculptor Robert George Irwin kills three people in Turtle Bay, Manhattan.

April–June

 April 12 – NLRB v. Jones & Laughlin Steel: The Supreme Court of the United States rules that the National Labor Relations Act is constitutional.
 April 13 – Organ Pipe Cactus National Monument is established.
 April 17 – The animated short Porky's Duck Hunt, directed by Tex Avery for the Looney Tunes series, featuring the debut of Daffy Duck, is released.
 May – 7 million unemployed in the USA.
 May 6 – Hindenburg disaster: The German airship Hindenburg bursts into flame when mooring to a mast in Lakehurst, New Jersey.
 May 7 – An enquiry begins into the Hindenburg disaster.
 May 27 – In California, the Golden Gate Bridge opens to pedestrian traffic, creating a vital link between San Francisco and Marin County. The next day, President Franklin D. Roosevelt pushes a button in Washington, D.C., signaling the start of vehicle traffic over the Golden Gate Bridge.
 May 30 – Labor strike at US Steel in Chicago; crackdown.
 June 14 – Pennsylvania becomes the first (and only) of the United States to celebrate Flag Day officially as a state holiday.
 June 20 – The first transpolar flight in history successfully arrives at Vancouver, Washington.
 June 24 – The U.S. Navy's first two fast battleships, North Carolina and Washington, are ordered from the New York and Philadelphia Naval Shipyards, respectively.
 June 25 – In The Bronx, an extended Orchard Beach recreation area opens, turning Hunter Island into a peninsula.

July–September

 July 2
 Amelia Earhart and navigator Fred Noonan disappear after taking off from New Guinea during Earhart's attempt to become the first woman to fly around the world.
 A guard first stands post at the Tomb of the Unknowns in Washington, D.C.; continuous guard has been maintained there ever since.
 July 4 – The Lost Colony historical drama is first performed in an outdoor theater in the location where it is set, Roanoke Island, North Carolina.
 July 5 – The canned precooked meat product Spam is introduced by the Hormel company.
 July 14 –  lands near San Jacinto, California
 July 22 – New Deal: The United States Senate votes down President Franklin D. Roosevelt's proposal to add more justices to the Supreme Court of the United States.
 July 24 – Alabama drops rape charges against the so-called Scottsboro Boys.
 September 7 – CBS broadcasts a two-and-a-half hour memorial concert nationwide on radio in memory of George Gershwin, live from the Hollywood Bowl.  Many celebrities appear, including Oscar Levant, Fred Astaire, Otto Klemperer, Lily Pons, and members of the original cast of Porgy and Bess. The concert is recorded and released complete years later in what is excellent sound for its time, on CD. The Los Angeles Philharmonic is the featured orchestra.
 September 18 – African American writer Zora Neale Hurston publishes her novel Their Eyes Were Watching God.
 September 20 – USS Yorktown is commissioned.
 September 26 – Street & Smith launches a half-hour radio program, The Shadow, with Orson Welles in the title role.

October–December
 October 1 
The Marijuana Tax Act becomes law in the United States.
U.S. Supreme Court associate justice Hugo Black, in a nationwide radio broadcast, refutes allegations of past involvement in the Ku Klux Klan.
 October 5 – Roosevelt gives his famous Quarantine Speech in Chicago.
 October 10 – The New York Yankees defeat the New York Giants (baseball), 4 games to 1, to win their 6th World Series Title.
 October 15 – Ernest Hemingway's novel To Have and Have Not is first published.
 December 12 
Panay incident: Japanese bombers sink the American gunboat USS Panay.
Mae West makes a risque guest appearance on the NBC Chase and Sanborn Hour that eventually results in her being banned from radio.
 December 21 – Walt Disney's Snow White and the Seven Dwarfs, the first feature-length animated cartoon with sound, opens and becomes a smash hit.
 December 22 – The Lincoln Tunnel, connecting New York City to Weehawken, New Jersey, under the Hudson River opens to road traffic.
 December 25 – At the age of 70, conductor Arturo Toscanini conducts the NBC Symphony Orchestra on radio for the first time, beginning his successful 17-year tenure with that orchestra.  This first concert consists of music by Vivaldi (at a time when he was still seldom played), Mozart, and Brahms. Millions tune in to listen, including U.S. President Franklin D. Roosevelt.

Undated
 Napoleon Hill's self-help book Think and Grow Rich is published.
 Serbin Fashions manufacturing facility opens in Tennessee in August.

Ongoing
 Lochner era (c. 1897–c. 1937)
 New Deal (1933–1939)
 Recession of 1937–1938 (1937–1938)

Births

January

 January 4
 Grace Bumbry, American opera singer
 Dyan Cannon, American actress, director, screenwriter, editor and producer
 Lorene Mann, American country music singer, songwriter (d. 2013)
 January 6 – Underwood Dudley, American mathematician
 January 10
 Daniel Walker Howe, American historian and academic  
 Thomas Penfield Jackson, American soldier, lawyer, and judge (d. 2013) 
 January 13 – George Reisman, American economist
 January 14 
 Leo Kadanoff, American physicist (d. 2015)
 Tom McEwen, American drag racer (d. 2018)
 Billie Jo Spears, American country music singer (d. 2011)
 January 15 – Margaret O'Brien, American actress
 January 16 – Francis George, American cardinal (d. 2015)
 January 19 – Fred J. Lincoln, American actor, director, producer and screenwriter (d. 2013)
 January 22 – Joseph Wambaugh, American author
 January 29 – Bobby Scott, American musician, producer and songwriter (d. 1990)
 January 31
 Philip Glass, American composer
 Suzanne Pleshette, American actress (d. 2008)

February

 February 1
 Don Everly, American rock and roll musician (The Everly Brothers) (d. 2021)
 Garrett Morris, African-American comedian, actor (Saturday Night Live)
 February 2
 Remak Ramsay, American actor
 Tom Smothers, American musician, comedian (The Smothers Brothers)
 February 4 
 Bill Ham, American music impresario and manager (d. 2016)
 David Newman, American screenwriter (d. 2003)
 February 5 – Stuart Damon, American actor (d. 2021)
 February 9
 William Lawvere, American mathematician
 Robert "Bilbo" Walker Jr., American blues guitarist (d. 2017)
 February 10 – Roberta Flack, African-American singer
 February 11 – Greg Noll,  American surfing pioneer (d. 2021)
 February 12 – Charles Dumas, American athlete (d. 2004)
 February 14 – Magic Sam, American musician (d. 1969)
 February 15
 Terry Everett, American politician
 Gregory Mcdonald, American novelist (d. 2008)
 February 17 – Mary Ann Mobley, American actress (d. 2014)
 February 20
 David Ackles, singer-songwriter and actor (d. 1999)
 Roger Penske, race car driver
 Nancy Wilson, African-American jazz singer and actress (d. 2018)
 February 21 – Ted Savage, American baseball player (d. 2023)
 February 23 – J. W. Lockett, American football player (d. 1999)
 February 25 – Bob Schieffer, American television journalist
 February 27 – Barbara Babcock, American actress

March

 March 3 – Bobby Driscoll, American actor (d. 1968)
 March 4 – Leslie H. Gelb, American foreign policy expert (d. 2019)
 March 8 – Richard Fariña, American folk music singer, novelist (d. 1966)
 March 16 
 William L. Armstrong, American politician
 Cal Browning, baseball player (died 2022)
 March 17
 Frank Calabrese, Sr., American gangster in the Chicago Outfit (d. 2012)
 Vince Martin, American singer, songwriter (d. 2018)
 March 20
 Jerry Reed, American singer, songwriter, actor, and guitarist (d. 2008)
 Eddie Shaw, African-American saxophonist and songwriter (d. 2018)
 March 22 – Angelo Badalamenti, American composer (d. 2022)
 March 23
 Craig Breedlove, American race car driver
 Tony Burton, African-American actor, boxer and football player (d. 2016)
 Robert Gallo, American biomedical researcher
 March 26 – Wayne Embry, American basketball player and team executive 
 March 27 – Thomas Aquinas Daly, American painter
 March 29 – Billy Carter, American farmer, businessman, brewer and politician (d. 1988)
 March 30 – Warren Beatty, American actor, director

April

 April 2 – Paul Kanjorski, American politician
 April 3 
 John Arrillaga, American real estate developer and philanthropist (d. 2022)
 Sandra Spuzich, American professional golfer (d. 2015)
 April 5
 Colin Powell, African-American general and politician, 65th U.S. Secretary of State (d. 2021)
 Maryanne Trump Barry, American attorney
 April 6
 Merle Haggard, American country musician (d. 2016)
 Billy Dee Williams, African-American actor
 April 7 – Charlie Thomas, American R&B musician
 April 8 – Seymour Hersh, American investigative journalist and political writer
 April 12
 Dennis Banks, leader of the American Indian Movement (d. 2017)
 Gene Lenz, American competition swimmer (d. 2005)
 April 13 – Lanford Wilson, American playwright (d. 2011)
 April 15 
 Robert W. Gore, American inventor (d. 2020)
 Frank Vincent, American actor (d. 2017)
 April 16 – George Steele, American professional wrestler and actor (d. 2017)
 April 17 – Don Buchla, American electronic-instrument designer (d. 2016)
 April 18 – Robert Hooks, African-American actor, producer and activist
 April 19 – Elinor Donahue, American actress
 April 20 – George Takei, Japanese-American actor, director, author and activist
 April 21 – David Lucas, American rock and roll composer, singer and music producer
 April 22
 Bobbi Fiedler, American politician (d. 2019)
 Jack Nicholson, American actor, film director, producer and writer
 Jack Nitzsche, American musician, arranger, songwriter, composer and record producer (d. 2000)
 April 23 – Don Massengale, American professional golfer (d. 2007)
 April 24 – Joe Henderson, American rhythm and blues, gospel music singer (d. 1964)
 April 26 – Bob Boozer, American professional basketball player (d. 2012)
 April 27 – Sandy Dennis, American actress (d. 1992)
 April 28 – Diane Hoh - American author

May

 May 2 – Lorenzo Music, American voice actor (d. 2001)
 May 4
 Ron Carter, American jazz musician
 Dick Dale, American surf rock guitarist (d. 2019)
 May 6 – Rubin Carter, African-American boxer wrongfully convicted of murder (d. 2014)
 May 8 – Dennis DeConcini, American politician
 May 9 – Alison Jolly, American primatologist (d. 2014)
 May 10
 Jim Hickman, American baseball outfielder (d. 2016)
 Arthur Kopit, American playwright (d. 2021)
 Mike Melvoin, American jazz pianist, composer and arranger (d. 2012)
 May 12 – George Carlin, American stand-up comedian, actor, author and social critic  (d. 2008)
 May 13
 Beverley Owen, American actress (d. 2019)
 Roger Zelazny, American writer (d. 1995)
 May 15
 Trini Lopez, American singer, guitarist and actor (d. 2020)
 Richard Robinson, American business executive and educator  (d. 2021)
 Joe Tait, American sportscaster (d. 2021)
 May 16
 Yvonne Craig, American actress (Batman) (d. 2015)
 Robert B. Wilson, American economist, Nobel Prize laureate
 May 17 – Hazel R. O'Leary, U.S. Secretary of Energy
 May 18 – Brooks Robinson, American baseball player
 May 24
 Timothy Brown, American football player and actor (d. 2020)
 Roger Peterson, American pilot who flew the plane on The Day the Music Died (d. 1959)
 May 25 – Mark Shields, American political analyst  (d. 2022)
 May 30 – Deanna Lund, American actress (d. 2018)

June

 June 1 – Morgan Freeman, African-American actor
 June 2 – Sally Kellerman, American actress (d. 2022)
 June 3
 Phyllis Baker, American professional baseball player (d. 2006)
 Anthony M. DeLuca, American politician (d. 2022)
 Crawford Hallock Greenewalt, Jr., American archaeologist (d. 2012)
 Solomon P. Ortiz, American soldier and politician
 John Walker, American politician (d. 2019)
 June 4 – Gorilla Monsoon, American professional wrestler, announcer (d. 1999)
 June 7 – Red Grooms, American painter and illustrator
 June 8
 Toni Harper, American child singer
 Bruce McCandless II, American astronaut (d. 2017)
 June 11 – David Mumford, American mathematician
 June 13 – Eleanor Holmes Norton, African-American politician
 June 15 – Waylon Jennings, American country singer (d. 2002)
 June 16 – Jim Dine, American painter
 June 18
 Wray Carlton, American football player
 Jay Rockefeller, American politician
 June 21
 Barbara Carlson, American politician
 Gerald Clarke, American author
 Jon Huntsman Sr., American businessman, philanthropist (d. 2018)
 June 25 – Eddie Floyd, African-American soul-R&B singer and songwriter
 June 26
 Donald J. Albanese, American politician
 Robert Coleman Richardson, American physicist, recipient of the Nobel Prize in Physics in 1996 (d. 2013)
 June 27 
 Joseph P. Allen, American astronaut
 Abraham Karem, American aerospace engineer
 June 28 – Ron Luciano, American baseball umpire, writer (d. 1995)
 June 30 
 Ron Husmann, American actor
 Walton McLeod, American politician

July

 July 2
 Polly Holliday, American actress
 Dennis Keeney, American soil science, water chemistry scientist
 Richard Petty, American stock car racer, 7-time NASCAR Winston Cup champion
 Martin J. Sherwin, American historian (d. 2021)
 July 4
 Richard Rhodes, American historian, journalist and author
 Ray Pillow, American country music singer
 July 6 – Ned Beatty, American actor (d. 2021)
 July 7 
 Carroll Hubbard, American politician (d. 2022)
 Carol Nugent, American actress
 July 12
 Bill Cosby, African-American actor, comedian, educator and convicted sex offender
 Bruce W. Klunder, American Presbyterian minister and civil rights activist (d. 1964)
 July 16 – Richard Bryan, American politician
 July 18 – Hunter S. Thompson, American author, journalist (d. 2005)
 July 19
 George Hamilton IV, American country music singer (d. 2014)
 Bibb Latané, American social psychologist
 July 20 – Dick Hafer, American Christian cartoonist (d. 2003)
 July 27 – Don Galloway, American actor (d. 2009)  
 July 29 – Daniel McFadden, American economist, Nobel Prize laureate
 July 31 — Sab Shimono, American actor

August

 August 1 – Al D'Amato, American politician
 August 3 – Roland Burris, American politician
 August 4
 Paul Abels, American United Methodist minister (d. 1992)
 David Bedford, American musician (d. 2011)
 David Holliday, American actor (d. 1999)
 August 5 – Herb Brooks, American hockey coach (d. 2003)
 August 6 – Charlie Haden, American jazz bassist (d. 2014)
 August 7 – Magic Slim, African-American blues singer and guitarist (d. 2013)
 August 8 – Dustin Hoffman, American actor, director
 August 14 – Alberta Nelson, American actress (d. 2006)
 August 21
 Robert Stone, American novelist (d. 2015)
 Chuck Traynor, American pornographer (d. 2002)
 August 26 – Don Bowman, American comedian, country music singer, songwriter, and radio host (d. 2013)
 August 27 – Alice Coltrane, African-American jazz harpist, organist, pianist and composer (d. 2007)
 August 31 – Bobby Parker, American rock musician (d. 2013)

September

September 1 
 Al Geiberger, golfer
 Ron O'Neal, actor, director, and screenwriter (d. 2004)
 Allen Weinstein, historian and academic (d. 2015)
 September 5 – A. George Pradel, American police officer, politician (d. 2018) 
 September 6 – Jo Anne Worley, American actress, comedian (Rowan and Martin's Laugh-In)
 September 7 – John Phillip Law, American actor (d. 2008)
 September 8 – Barbara Frum, American radio and television journalist (d. 1992)
 September 10 
 Jared Diamond, American geographer, anthropologist, and author (Guns, Germs, and Steel)
 Tommy Overstreet, American country singer (d. 2015)
 September 13 – Don Bluth, American animator, film director, producer, writer, production designer, video game designer and animation instructor
 September 15
 King Curtis Iaukea, American professional wrestler (d. 2010)
 Robert Lucas, Jr., American economist, Nobel Prize laureate
 September 19 – Abner Haynes, American football player
 September 20
 George Izo, American football player (d. 2022)
 Robert L. Gerry III, businessman
 September 26 – Jerry Weintraub, American film producer, talent agent (d. 2015)
 September 28 
 Rod Roddy, American television announcer (d. 2003)
 Bob Schul, American Olympic athlete

October

 October 2 – Johnnie Cochran, African-American attorney (d. 2005)
 October 4 – Leon Thomas, American jazz and blues singer (d. 1999)
 October 5 – Barry Switzer, American football coach
 October 8 – Frank Cignetti Sr., American football player and coach (d. 2022)
 October 10 – Danny Kaleikini, American singer and entertainer (d. 2023)
 October 15 – Linda Lavin, American actress and singer 
 October 20 – Wanda Jackson, American singer, songwriter, pianist and guitarist
 October 22 – Alan Ladd Jr., American film executive and producer (d. 2022)
 October 24 – John Goetz, American professional baseball player (d. 2008)
 October 25 – Jeanne Black, American singer (d. 2014)
 October 26 – John "Jabo" Starks, African-American drummer (d. 2018)
 October 28 – Lenny Wilkens, American basketball player, coach
 October 31 – Tom Paxton, American folk singer-songwriter

November

 November 1 – Bill Anderson, American country music singer, songwriter and game show host
 November 2 
 Earl Carroll, African-American lead vocalist for The Cadillacs (d. 2012)
 Bob Spoo, American football coach (d. 2018)
 November 4 – Loretta Swit, American actress (M*A*S*H)
 November 5 – Harris Yulin, American actor
 November 7 – Wayne Yates, American basketball player (d. 2022)
 November 9 – Vernon Taylor, American rockabilly musician
 November 12
 Mills Lane, American boxer, referee, lawyer and judge (d. 2022)
 Richard H. Truly, American admiral, pilot and astronaut
 November 15 – Little Willie John, African-American rock and roll, rhythm and blues singer (d. 1968)
 November 20 – Ruth Laredo, American pianist (d. 2005)
 November 21 – Marlo Thomas, American actress, producer and social activist (That Girl)
 November 30 – Luther Ingram, African-American R&B singer, songwriter (d. 2007)

December

 December 1 – Bruce Brown, American documentary film director (d. 2017)
 December 3
 Bobby Allison, American race car driver
 John Seymour, American politician
 December 7 – Thad Cochran, American politician (d. 2019)
 December 8
 Michael Bowen, American artist (d. 2009 in Sweden)
 James MacArthur, American actor (d. 2010)
 December 9 – Darwin Joston, American actor (d. 1998)
 December 11 
Beegie Adair, American jazz pianist and bandleader (d. 2022)
Jim Harrison, American writer (d. 2016)
 December 12 
 Connie Francis, American singer
 Flukey Stokes, American mobster (d. 1986)
 December 13 – Jon A. Reynolds, United States Air Force officer (d. 2022)
 December 16 – Ed Ruscha, American painter
 December 17 – Art Neville, African-American singer, songwriter (d. 2019)
 December 20 –  John L. Canley, American Medal of Honour recipient (d. 2022)
 December 21 
 Jane Fonda, American actress and political activist
 Donald F. Munson, American politician
 December 27 – Tom Tall, American singer (d. 2013)
 December 30
 John Hartford, American musician, composer (d. 2001)
 Jim Marshall, American football player
 Noel Paul Stookey, American singer (Peter, Paul and Mary)

Deaths

 January 1 – J. Gresham Machen, Presbyterian theologian (born 1881)
 January 2 – Ross Alexander, actor (born 1907)
 January 11 – Emma Amelia Cranmer, prohibition reformer and suffragist (born 1858)
 January 13 – Martin Johnson, adventurer and filmmaker (born 1884)
 February 7 – Elihu Root, statesman and diplomat, recipient of the Nobel Peace Prize in 1912 (born 1845)
 February 11 – Walter Burley Griffin, architect and town planner (born 1876)
 March 1 – DeWitt Jennings, actor (born 1871)
 March 15 – H. P. Lovecraft, horror fiction author (born 1890)
 March 29 – William Edward White, African American baseball player (born 1860)
 April 10 – Ralph Ince, film director (born 1887)
 April 14 – Ned Hanlon, baseball manager (born 1857)
 April 16 – Jay Johnson Morrow, military engineer and politician, 3rd Governor of the Panama Canal Zone (born 1870)
 May 14 – John Burke, 24th Treasurer of the United States (born 1859)
 May 23 – John D. Rockefeller, oil industry business magnate and philanthropist (born 1839)
 June 7 – Jean Harlow, actress and sex symbol (born 1911)
 July 2 – Amelia Earhart, aviator, missing on flight (born 1897) 
 July 9 – Oliver Law, labor organizer and Army officer, killed in Spanish Civil War (born 1899)
 July 11 – George Gershwin, popular composer (born 1898)
 July 14 – Joseph Taylor Robinson, politician (born 1872)
 July 29 – Ella Maria Ballou, writer (born 1852)
 August 11 – Edith Wharton, novelist (born 1862)
 August 21 – Hannah J. Patterson, suffragist and social activist (born 1879)
 August 27 – Andrew Mellon, banker and Secretary of the Treasury (born 1855)
 September 8 – Anna Hempstead Branch, poet (born 1875)
 September 11 –  Loraine Wyman, folk singer and dulcimer player (born 1885)
 September 13 – Ellis Parker Butler, humorist (born 1869)
 September 21 – Osgood Perkins, actor (born 1892)
 September 22 – Ruth Roland, actress (born 1892)
 September 26 – Bessie Smith, African American blues singer (born 1894)
 September 29 – Ray Ewry, field athlete (born 1873)
 October 6 – Blind Uncle Gaspard, Cajun musician (born 1880)
 October 22 – George Horace Lorimer, newspaper editor (born 1867)
 November 6 – Colin Campbell Cooper, painter (born 1856)
 November 25 – Raymond Stanton Patton, admiral (born 1882)
 November 30 – James O. McKinsey, accountant and pioneer of management consulting (born 1889)
 December 6 – Florence Griswold, curator (born 1850)
 December 21
 Ted Healy, vaudeville actor (born 1896)
 Frank B. Kellogg, United States Secretary of State, recipient of the Nobel Peace Prize in 1929 (born 1856)
 December 25 – Newton D. Baker, United States Secretary of War (born 1871)
 December 29 – Don Marquis, poet (born 1878)
 Undated
 Rabbit Brown, country blues singer (born c. 1880)
 Redoshi, penultimate survivor of the transatlantic slave trade (born c. 1848 in West Africa)

See also
 List of American films of 1937
 Timeline of United States history (1930–1949)

References

External links
 

 
1930s in the United States
United States
United States
Years of the 20th century in the United States